Eclipse Phase is a science fiction horror role-playing game with transhumanist themes.  Originally published by Catalyst Game Labs, Eclipse Phase is now published by the game's creators, Posthuman Studios, and is released under a Creative Commons license.

Setting

Eclipse Phase is a science fiction game based on transhumanism, and the themes of post-apocalyptic, conspiracy, and horror. It takes place after a World War III project to create artificial intelligence known as TITANs has gone rogue, resulting in the deaths of over 90% of the inhabitants of Earth.

Earth is subsequently abandoned, and existing colonies throughout the Solar System are expanded to accommodate the refugees. The setting explores a spectrum of socioeconomic systems in each of these colonies:
A capitalist / republican system exists in the Inner System (Mars, the Moon, and Mercury), under the Planetary Consortium, a corporate body which allows the election of representatives but whose shareholders are nominally most powerful.
An Extropian/Propertarian system is established in the Asteroid Belt. The Extropians are split into two subfactions, an anarcho-capitalist group, more closely related to the Hypercapitalists and a mutualist group, related closely to the Anarchists.
A military oligarchy rules the moons around Jupiter.
An alliance of Scandinavia-style social democracy and Collectivist anarchism are dominant in the Outer System.

From there, the setting explores various scientific advances, extrapolated far into the future. Nanotechnology, terraforming, Zero-G living, upgrading animal sapience, and reputation systems are all used as plot points and background.

With all of this, the game encourages players to confront existential threats like aliens, weapons of mass destruction, Exsurgent Virus outbreaks, and political unrest.

Mechanics
Eclipse Phase uses a simple roll-under percentile die system for task resolution. Players roll the percentile dice (by rolling two ten-sided dice with one of the dice representing a 10 value), and compare that roll to a target number with the goal being to match or go under that number with the roll. Unlike most similar systems, a roll of 00 does not count as a 100. In addition, any roll of a double (11, 22, 33 etc.) is a critical. If the double is under the target number it is a critical success, while being over the target number constitutes a critical failure.

For damage resolution (whether physical damage caused by injury or mental stress caused by traumatic events), players roll a designated number of ten-sided dice and add the values together, along with any modifiers.

Books

Released 
Eclipse Phase (Core Rulebook) (2009) 
Sunward, 
Gatecrashing 
Panopticon (2011)
Rimward (2012)
Transhuman (2013)
Firewall (2015)
X-Risks (2016)
Eclipse Phase (Core Rulebook, Second Edition) (2019)

Nano Ops 
Nano Op: Grinder
Nano Op: All That Glitters
Nano Op: Better on the Inside
Nano Op: Binge
Nano Op: Body Count

Upcoming 

 Lifepath Character Creation (Second Edition) - In Layout
 Morph Recognition Guide, Revised (Title TBD) - Layout
 Your Whispering Muse (EP2 KS Stretch Goal) - Dev
 Blackvein's Underworld Guide - Drafts
 System Gazetteer - Outline
 Space Combat (Final Title TBD) - Outline/Drafts

Creative Commons License
The Eclipse Phase roleplaying game was released under a Creative Commons Attribution-Noncommercial-Share Alike 3.0 license, and newer printings have updated to the Creative Commons Attribution-Noncommercial-Share Alike 4.0 license ; the text found on the Eclipse Phase website is licensed under the Creative Commons Attribution-Noncommercial-Share Alike 4.0 License. As stated on their website, the publishers encourage players and gamemasters to recreate, alter, and "remix" the material for non-commercial purposes as long as Posthuman Studios is attributed, and any derivatives are licensed under the same Creative Commons Attribution-Noncommercial-Share Alike 4.0 License. Further, copying and sharing the game's electronic versions non-commercially is legal.

Reception

In 2010, it won the 36th Annual Origins award for Best Roleplaying Game of 2009. It also won three 2010 ENnie awards: Gold for Best Writing, Silver for Best Cover Art, and Silver for Product of the Year.

See also
 Transhuman Space
 Orion's Arm
 Hard science fiction

References

External links
 
 Eclipse Phase page at Geekdo

Creative Commons-licensed books
Creative Commons-licensed games
ENnies winners
Games about extraterrestrial life
Malware in fiction
Origins Award winners
Post-apocalyptic role-playing games
Role-playing games introduced in 2009
Science fiction horror
Science fiction role-playing games
Social reputation in fiction
Dystopian fiction
Fiction about consciousness transfer
Fiction about the Solar System
Transhumanism in fiction
Cybernetted society in fiction
Brain–computer interfacing in fiction
Genetic engineering in fiction
Biorobotics in fiction
Artificial intelligence in fiction
Artificial wormholes in fiction
Cyborgs in fiction